Presents Kumbia Kings is the first compilation album and fifth album by Mexican-American cumbia group A.B. Quintanilla y Los Kumbia Kings and the first compilation album by Mexican-American musician A.B. Quintanilla. It was released on April 1, 2003 by EMI Latin. All of the songs in the album are in English. The album includes eight previously released songs and four new songs recorded for the album.

Track listing

References

2003 compilation albums
Kumbia Kings albums
A. B. Quintanilla albums
Albums produced by A.B. Quintanilla
Albums produced by Cruz Martínez
EMI Latin compilation albums
Cumbia albums
Albums recorded at Q-Productions